Mantura obtusata is a species of Chrysomelidae family, that can be found nearly everywhere in Europe.

References

Beetles described in 1813
Alticini